Merry Renk (born Mary Ruth Gibbs; July 8, 1921 – June 17, 2012), also known as Merry Renk-Curtis, was an American jewelry designer, metalsmith, sculptor and painter. In 1951, she helped to found the Metal Arts Guild (MAG), and served as its president in 1954.

Biography 
Mary Ruth Gibbs was born on July 8, 1921 in Trenton, New Jersey. 

From 1939 until 1941, she attended the Trenton School of Industrial Arts to study painting. In 1946, she moved to Chicago and enrolled in the IIT Institute of Design, studying industrial design. Between 1947 and 1948, Renk co-founded 750 Studio at 750 N. Dearborn Street in Chicago with Olive Oliver and Mary Jo Slick. They lived in the back of the building, which they renovated. 

750 Studio is credited as "the first contemporary arts and crafts gallery in America to show abstract art". The gallery showed works by well-known artists including Henry Miller, László Moholy-Nagy, Harry Callahan, and Margaret De Patta. During this time Renk became interested in enamels on metal and began working in metals; she was largely self-taught as a jeweler.

In 1948, Renk traveled to Europe and eventually settled in San Francisco. Renk started creating organic forms in her jewelry and they grew in popularity. In 1950 she went to Paris, and to Spain and Morocco with Lenore Tawney, returning to San Francisco in 1951. 

Then and later, she commemorated events that she found important, such as a meeting with Constantin Brâncuși in 1951, in "Memory" paintings incorporating both words and images. 

Invited by Margaret de Patta, Renk became a founding member of the Metal Arts Guild of San Francisco (MAG) in 1951. MAG was the first organization in the United States to address the needs of studio jewelers.

Other founding members included Vera Allison, 
Irena Brynner, 
Margaret de Patta, 
Florence Resnikoff,
Francis Spensen,
Byron August Wilson, 
Bob Winston, 
Peter Macchiarini, and
Virginia Macchiarini. In 1954, Renk served as President of the Metal Arts Guild. She remained active in the group until age 90.

Around the mid-1950s Renk began creating intricate tiaras and crowns. In 1969, she was one of 250 artists invited to participate in the national touring exhibition exhibition Objects: USA sponsored by S. C. Johnson & Son. Renk created a wedding crown of interlocking gold petals and 240 pearls, White Cloud. It was one of her largest ornamental objects, and brought her international recognition.

Either in the 1960s or in a car accident in 1974, Renk sustained an eye injury.  For a time she turned to creating large-scale metal sculptures, applying many of the interlocking techniques she used in her jewelry.
In 1982, at the age of 60, she decided to return to painting. 
In 1994, Renk was elected a fellow at the American Craft Council (ACC).

Awards
 1960, purchase award, San Francisco Arts Festival
 1961, merit award, San Francisco Arts Festival
 1974, NEA Fellowship, National Endowment for the Arts 
 1986, Distinguished Work and Achievement in Crafts Award, City and County of San Francisco 
 1994, Fellow, American Craft Council
 Distinguished Member of the

Legacy 
Renk's work is in many public museum collections including the Renwick Gallery, the Oakland Museum of California, and the Museum of Fine Arts, Boston, among others. 

In 1981, the California Crafts Museum featured her in the exhibition merry renk, jeweler: a visual biography and retrospective, 1947- 1981.

In 2011, her jewelry was featured by the Los Angeles County Museum of Art (LACMA), along with that of Peter Macchiarini, in the exhibition, California Design 1930-1965: Living in the Modern Way.
The exhibitions Pacific Standard Time: Art in Los Angeles, 1945-1980 (2011-2012) at the Los Angeles County Museum of Art, and Crafting Modernism: Mid-century American Art and Design (2011) at the Museum of Arts and Design, also feature her with other MAG artists.

Personal life 
In 1941, Mary Ruth Gibbs married Stanley Edwin Renk. Her first husband Stanley died in 1945 during World War II. In 1958, she married potter Earle Watt Curtis, with whom she had two daughters. Earle Watt Curtis died in October 30, 2008.
Merry Renk died on June 17, 2012 in San Francisco of congestive heart failure.

Archives 
 Merry Renk papers, 1952-2000, Archives of American Art, Smithsonian Institution, Washington, DC.
 Oral history interview with Merry Renk, 2001 January 18-19, Archives of American Art, Smithsonian Institution.
 Interview with Merry Renk, 2012 April 28, Archives of American Art, Smithsonian Institution.

References 

1921 births
2012 deaths
American jewelry designers
People from Trenton, New Jersey
American women artists
21st-century American women
Women jewellers